The Blue Lagoon is a 1923 silent film adaptation of Henry De Vere Stacpoole's 1908 novel of the same name about children who come of age while stranded on a tropical island. It is the first screen adaptation of the story and was followed by two other adaptations that were released in 1949 and 1980. The film performed poorly in South African cinemas and is considered now to be lost.

Cast
 Molly Adair as Emmeline
 Val Chard as Dick
 Dick Cruikshanks as Paddy Button
 Arthur Pusey as young Dick
 Doreen Wonfer as younger Emmeline

Crew
 W. Bowden - Director of Photography

See also 
 The Blue Lagoon, 1949 version
 The Blue Lagoon, 1980 version
 Blue Lagoon: The Awakening, a Lifetime television movie
 Friends
 Paradise
 Return to the Blue Lagoon, 1991 version
 State of nature

References

External links
 

1923 films
Films based on British novels
Films based on works by Henry De Vere Stacpoole
Films set on uninhabited islands
British silent feature films
British black-and-white films
Films about children
British coming-of-age films
1923 drama films
1920s teen films
Juvenile sexuality in films
1920s British films